Elijah L. Nevett (born April 28, 1944) is a former American football defensive back in the National Football League. After playing college football at Clark Atlanta University, he played professionally for the New Orleans Saints from 1967 to 1970.

References

External links
 Elijah Nevett on pro-football-reference.com

1944 births
Living people
American football cornerbacks
Clark Atlanta Panthers football players
New Orleans Saints players
Sportspeople from Bessemer, Alabama
Players of American football from Alabama